Allseas Group S.A. is a Swiss-based offshore contractor specialising in pipelay, heavy lift and subsea construction. It was founded in 1985 by owner and president Edward Heerema, employs 4,000 people and operates worldwide.

The company is headquartered in Châtel-Saint-Denis, Switzerland. It also owns a subsidiary, Allseas Engineering B.V., based in the Netherlands with offices in Delft, Eindhoven and Enschede, which provides project management and engineering services to the group. The company also operates project and engineering offices out of Australia, Brazil and the USA.

Allseas operates a versatile fleet of specialised heavy-lift, pipelay and subsea installation vessels. The company has installed over 20,000 km of subsea pipeline worldwide using S-lay technology, with diameters ranging from 2 to 48 inches. Allseas launched its first vessel Lorelay, the world's first pipelay vessel to operate on full dynamic positioning, in 1986. It also owns Pioneering Spirit, the world's largest construction vessel, designed for the single-lift installation and removal of large oil and gas platforms and the installation of record-weight pipelines.

History 
Allseas was founded in January 1985 by Edward Heerema, son of the late Pieter Schelte Heerema, founder of the Dutch offshore construction and installation company Heerema Marine Contractors. Offices subsequently opened in The Hague,  Netherlands and Châtel-Saint-Denis, Switzerland.

The company spent its early days developing the concept of dynamically positioned (DP) subsea pipelay. Allseas acquired the former bulk carrier Natalie Bolten in 1985 and converted it for DP pipelay at the Boele shipyard in Bolnes, the Netherlands. The vessel was christened Lorelay in Rotterdam on 26 April 1986. Lorelay immediately entered service and successfully executed her first pipelay contract, the 8-inch, 1.8-km Helder A-B pipeline, for Unocal in the Dutch sector of the North Sea.

In 2007, Allseas announced plans to build a twin-hulled platform installation / decommissioning and pipelay vessel. At 382 m long and 124 m wide, the vessel would be the largest ever built. It was to be named Pieter Schelte after the offshore pioneer Pieter Schelte Heerema, father of Allseas’ owner and founder Edward Heerema, however this naming caused controversy with some politicians and Jewish groups due to Pieter's previous service in the Waffen-SS during World War II, for which he was jailed for three years after the war. In February 2015, Allseas stated that the ship would be renamed Pioneering Spirit.

A criminal trial in the UK in 2016 revealed that Allseas were victims of a multi-million pound fraud. In 2011, they invested £73 million with investors led by Luis Nobre claiming to have links to the Vatican and Spanish nobility.

In 2018, Allseas announced its intention to build an even larger version of Pioneering Spirit, named Amazing Grace, which is scheduled to be delivered in 2022. However, in July 2020, Allseas announced that it would suspend the project indefinitely.

Fleet 
The company owns several vessels which are used for its offshore construction activities.

References

Construction and civil engineering companies of Switzerland
Privately held companies of Switzerland
Oilfield services companies
Swiss companies established in 1985 
Construction and civil engineering companies established in 1985